Giuseppe Calcia (active 1725) (also called Il Genovesino) was an Italian painter, born in the Piedmont. He should not be confused with the Milanese painter Marco Genovesini. Giuseppe painted altar-pieces for the churches of Turin and Alessandria.  He painted a ' St. Dominic' and ' St. Thomas Aquinas ' for the church of the Dominicans at  Turin.

References

18th-century Italian painters
Italian male painters
Italian Baroque painters
Painters from Piedmont
Year of death missing
18th-century Italian male artists